Coulter Field  is a public airport three miles northeast of Bryan, in Brazos County, Texas. It is owned by the City of Bryan which is part of the Bryan-College Station area. The airport is used for general aviation.

History
Coulter Field has a long history with sport parachuting, with parachute jumps having been conducted since the mid-1950s.  Ags Over Texas (AOT) was the home of the Texas A&M University skydiving team until its closure in 1999.  In March 2002, Skydive Aggieland opened and is the current home of the Texas A&M University skydiving club.  Texas Governor Rick Perry completed a successful static-line skydive at AOT while he was attending Texas A&M University in the 1970s and former President George H. W. Bush (41) completed a tandem skydive at Coulter Field in cooperation with Skydive Aggieland and the Golden Knights a day prior to completing his last jump at his Presidential Library on Texas A&M University main campus.

Facilities
Its runway, 15/33, is 4,000 by 75 feet (1,219 x 23 m). A former turf runway 17/35 is closed.

In the year ending July 16, 2008 the airport had 16,200 general aviation aircraft operations, average 44 per day. 66 aircraft were then based at the airport: 82% single-engine, 15% multi-engine and 3% helicopter.

References

External links 
  at Texas DOT Airport Directory
 
 

Airports in Texas
Buildings and structures in Brazos County, Texas
Transportation in Brazos County, Texas
Bryan, Texas